Engelgarten Charterhouse or Würzburg Charterhouse is a former Carthusian monastery, or charterhouse, in Würzburg in Bavaria, Germany.

History
The monastery was dedicated on 13 May 1352 by the bishop-elect of Würzburg Albrecht von Hohenlohe. The extensive monastery precinct, with church and outbuildings, gardens and fishponds, through which the Kürnach flowed, stretched from the present Berliner Ring as far as the Mainfranken Theater, on both sides of the modern Ludwigstrasse, where the hotel Zum Karthäuser and the street name Kartause still indicate the area's past.

During the Thirty Years' War Engelgarten gave refuge in 1631 to the Carthusian community from Grünau, who had been forced to take flight from the Swedes. Shortly afterwards, however, Würzburg was also taken, and the charterhouse was plundered.

The monastery was dissolved in 1803 during the secularisation of Bavaria. The church was given to the Protestants. In 1853 it was demolished to make way for the construction of the former railway station of the Ludwigs-West-Bahn, on the site of the present Mainfranken Theater.

Notes

References
 Albrecht, C.F., 1996: Die Architektur der fränkischen Kartausen, in: Kartäuser in Franken, pp. 48–78. Würzburg (Kirche, Kunst und Kultur in Franken; 5)
 Backmund, N., 1974: Die kleineren Orden in Bayern und ihre Klöster bis zur Säkularisation, pp. 70–71. Abtei Windberg
 Braun, E., 1979: Die Kartäuser und ihre Gründung in der Stadt Würzburg im 14. Jahrhundert (theological dissertation). Würzburg
 Engel, W., 1952: 600 Jahre Kartause Engelgarten zu Würzburg,  in: Altfränkische Bilder, 51
 Gropp, I., 1741: Collectio rarissima scriptorum et rerum Wirceburgensium a saeculo XVI., XVII et XVIII, vol. 1. Frankfurt
 Hogg, J., 1996: Die Kartause Grünau, in: Kartäuser in Franken, pp. 79–94. Würzburg (Kirche, Kunst und Kultur in Franken; 5)
 Hogg, J., 1996: Die Kartause Würzburg, in: Kartäuser in Franken, pp. 95–100. Würzburg
 Markert, E., 1952: Zur Erinnerung an die Würzburger Kartause Engelgarten, in: Heiliges Franken, pp. 179–180. Würzburg
 Memminger, T., 1921: Würzburgs Straßen und Bauten. Würzburg
 Mühlberg, S.D., 1949: Zur Klosteranlage des Kartäuserordens, pp. 63–66 (dissertation). Cologne
 Pabel, A., 2003: Coenobia sunt paradisus in terris et in eis degentes sunt angeli, in: Einbandforschung, 12, pp. 31–37
 Seberich, F., 1958: Tore und Türme im alten Würzburg, in: Mainlande
 Ullrich, P.E., 1898: Die Karthause Engelgarten in Würzburg, in: Archiv des Historischen Vereins von Unterfranken und Aschaffenburg, part 1, 40, pp. 1–72

Sources and external links
 Klöster in Bayern 

Monasteries in Bavaria
Carthusian monasteries in Germany
1350s establishments in the Holy Roman Empire
1352 establishments in Europe
1803 disestablishments in Europe
Roman Catholic churches in Würzburg